Tyler Krueger is an American ice hockey coach and former player who was the NCAA Division III coach of the year in 2019.

Career
A native of Stevens Point, Wisconsin, Krueger's college career began in 2010 at his home-town university. He played four years for the team, helping the program return to prominence with an NCAA tournament bid in his senior season, the first for the pointers in 16 years. After graduating, Krueger took a year off before returning to his alma mater as an assistant coach. His appointment coincided with the Pointers winning the 5th national championship in program history.

After two years as an assistant, Krueger was promoted to interim head coach after Chris Brooks left for a Division I job. The team responded to their new coach with an appearance in the National Semifinal, leading the administration to hire Krueger on full-time. The very next season, Krueger led Wisconsin–Stevens Point to the first undefeated season in the history of Division III hockey and was named as the national coach of the year.

Statistics

Regular season and playoffs

Head coaching record

References

External links

1990 births
American ice hockey coaches
American men's ice hockey players
Living people
Ice hockey people from Wisconsin
People from Stevens Point, Wisconsin
University of Wisconsin–Stevens Point alumni
University of Wisconsin–Stevens Point faculty